Esquipulas is a municipality in the Matagalpa department of Nicaragua.

Geography 
To the north, Esquipulas borders the municipalities of San Dionisio and Matagalpa, and to the south Boaco and San José de los Remates.

Climate 
The municipality enjoys mild temperatures with a rainy season from May - December and a dry season between January and April.

References

Municipalities of the Matagalpa Department